Pidasa or Pedasa (Πήδασα) was a town of ancient Caria. During the Ionian Revolt, the Persians suffered a defeat at Pidasa. It was once the chief seat of the Leleges. It was a polis (city-state) and a member of the Delian League. In the early Second Century B.C., Miletus absorbed the citizens and territory of Pidasa through a sympoliteia agreement. 

In the time of Strabo the town had ceased to exist, and the name of the district, Pedasis (Πηδασίς), was the only remaining memorial of the place. As Herodotus assigns to Pedasa a portion of the territory of Miletus, the town must have been situated between Miletus, Halicarnassus, and Stratoniceia.

Its site is located near Cert Osman Kale, Asiatic Turkey, which is consistent with Herodotus' account.

References

Populated places in ancient Caria
Former populated places in Turkey
Greek city-states
Members of the Delian League